Brammibal's Donuts is a chain of six vegan cafés selling donuts in Berlin, Germany. It is the first such chain in Europe.

Product range 
Brammibal's offer six donut "classics" and a number of changing "specials". The chain's palette also includes one charity donut, with part of the proceeds going to a different charity every month. The donut shops also serve coffee drinks, and are popular with Instagram users.

History 
Brammibal's was founded in 2015 by the couple Jessica Jeworutzki and Bram van Montfort. They initially sold donuts at markets and events until they opened their first donut shop in 2016. They have financed their expansion through crowdfunding, an ecological bank, and a loan from van Montfort's father. One crowdfunding campaign in 2015 failed to raise the funds required to open a shop. Van Montfort is a former band musician while Jeworutzki used to work as a hospital nurse.

Reception 
In 2016, Exberliner called Brammibal's Donuts "Berlin's vegan sensation of the year". In 2021, Tina Hütterl of the Berliner Zeitung gave the donuts of Brammibal's an excellent review, describing them as "the best of my life", indistinguishable from non-vegan donuts, and tasting "as good as they look like". In 2022, Manuel Almeida Vergara of the Berliner Zeitung found that the taste of Brammibal's donuts is inferior to the donuts offered by Dunkin' Donuts.

References 

Vegan organizations
Vegan brands
Veganism in Germany